The Japan national beach soccer team represents Japan in international beach soccer competitions and is controlled by the JFA, the governing body for football in Japan. One of the leading Asian beach soccer teams, Japan's best performance at the FIFA Beach Soccer World Cup was second place in  2021.

Results and fixtures

Legend

2022

Fixtures & Results (Beach soccer 2022), JFA.jp

2023

Fixtures & Results (Beach Soccer 2023), JFA.jp

Coaching staff

Current coaching staff

Source: Coaches

Manager history

 Ruy Ramos (20xx–2019)
 Teruki Tabata (2020–present)
 Ozu Moreira (2021, interim)

Players

Current squad
The following players were called up to Japan's final squad for the 2023 AFC Beach Soccer Asian Cup. Masanori Okuyama, injured, was officially replaced by Ryunosuke Ito on 15 March.

Previous squads
2021 FIFA Beach Soccer World Cup squad

Competitive record

FIFA Beach Soccer World Cup

AFC Beach Soccer Asian Cup

Asian Beach Games

Beach Soccer Intercontinental Cup

Continental Beach Soccer Tournament

Neom Beach Soccer Cup

World ranking
Source: Beach Soccer Worldwide

See also

Japan
Men's
International footballers
National football team (Results (2020–present))
National under-23 football team
National under-20 football team
National under-17 football team
National futsal team
National under-20 futsal team
National beach soccer team
Women's
International footballers
National football team (Results)
National under-20 football team
National under-17 football team
National futsal team

References

External links
 Japan at JFA.jp
Japan at BSWW
 Japan at Beach Soccer Russia

Asian national beach soccer teams
Beach soccer